"Dark Days" is a song by Scottish singer-songwriter and acoustic guitarist Gerry Cinnamon. It was released as a single on 1 November 2019 by Little Runaway Records as the third single from his second studio album The Bonny. The song was written by Gerry Cinnamon, who also co-produced the song with Chris Marshall.

Charts

Release history

References

2019 songs
2019 singles
Gerry Cinnamon songs